Sir Ian Clifford Powell (born 1956) is an English business executive and chartered accountant. He has been chairman of Capita since 2017. He was previously chairman and senior partner at PricewaterhouseCoopers (2008–16)

Early life and education 
Born in 1956 in Coseley, Powell attended High Arcal Grammar School and then studied economics at Wolverhampton Polytechnic, graduating with a BA in 1977.

Career

Business 
In 1977, Powell joined the professional services firm Price Waterhouse (later PricewaterhouseCoopers) as a trainee. He worked in assurance until 1986, when he moved to the firm's Business Recovery Services division. Made partner in 1991, he sat on the firm's UK management board from 2006 to 2008. In 2008, he became its senior partner and chairman. He left these roles and PwC in June 2016.

In January 2017, Powell was appointed chairman of Capita.

Non-profit and advisory 
Powell has been chairman of Police Now since 2016. He has also been on the board of trustees of The Old Vic theatre since 2016 and the board of London First since 2018.

Honours and awards 
In 2010, Powell received an honorary Doctor of Business Administration (DBA) degree from the University of Wolverhampton. He was knighted in the 2017 New Year Honours for "services to professional services and volunteer service".

References

Further reading 
 Andrew Cave, "Ian Powell of PwC, the Man Sorting out the Mess Left by Lehman's Collapse", The Telegraph, 28 November 2009.
Simon Bowers, "PwC Chairman to Receive £3.7m Share of Rising Profits as Business Grows", The Guardian, 15 September 2014.
 Lauren Fendor, "Capita Names PwC Veteran Ian Powell as New Chairman", Financial Times, 4 July 2016.
 "PwC Veteran Called in to Chair Capita", The Sunday Times, 10 July 2016.
 "Former PwC Chief Ian Powell Knighted", Accounting Web, 31 December 2016.

Living people
1956 births
British accountants
British business executives
People from Coseley
Alumni of the University of Wolverhampton
Knights Bachelor